is a Japanese economist. He is a professor at Keio University.

Career
He received a B.A. from Osaka University in 1982 and a Ph.D. from University of Chicago in 1988.

Bibliography

Books

Journal articles

References

External links
 Masao Ogaki's Homepage
 Faculty profile at Keio University
 

1958 births
Living people
20th-century Japanese economists
21st-century Japanese economists
Macroeconomists
Econometricians
Behavioral economists
Osaka University alumni
University of Chicago alumni
University of Rochester faculty
Ohio State University faculty
Academic staff of Keio University
Presidents of the Japanese Economic Association
Place of birth missing (living people)